Thomas Noonan, Tom Noonan or Tommy Noonan may refer to:

Tommy Noonan (1921–1968), American television and film actor
Thomas S. Noonan (1938–2001), American historian, anthropologist and Slavicist
Thomas P. Noonan Jr. (1943–1969), American Marine lance corporal 
Tommy Noonan (1945-2014), American Photographer
Tom Noonan (born 1951), American film, television and theatre actor-writer 
Thomas Noonan (musician) (born 1974), American drummer

See also
Edward Thomas Noonan (1861–1923), American lawyer and legislator
John Thomas Noonan, Jr. (1926–2017), American jurist and moral theologian 
Noonan